Necar Zadegan (born June 20, 1982) is an American actress. Zadegan made her Broadway debut alongside Robin Williams in the Pulitzer Prize–nominated production Bengal Tiger at the Baghdad Zoo in 2011. She is known for playing First Lady (and then President) Dalia Hassan on the eighth season of 24 then leading in the roles of Delia Banai on Girlfriends' Guide to Divorce and Special Agent Hannah Khoury on NCIS: New Orleans.

Early life 
Zadegan was born on June 20, 1982 in Heidelberg, Baden-Württemberg, West Germany, and raised in the San Francisco Bay Area. She is of Iranian heritage.

Zadegan graduated with honors from the University of California, Santa Barbara (UCSB) with a BA degree in Literature. She spent a semester abroad at the Sorbonne University. She speaks Persian (Farsi), French, English, and German fluently.

Career 
From 2005 to 2009, Zadegan amassed a number of television credits namely The Bernie Mac Show, Nip/Tuck, NCIS: Naval Criminal Investigative Service, The Unit, How I Met Your Mother, Big Shots, Lost, The Shield, and CSI: Miami.

In 2009, Zadegan appeared in the Persian language stage production of From Satellite with Love "Az Mahvareh Ta Eshgh", touring in the U.S. and Europe.

In 2009 Zadegan   of 'The Leper' in Rajiv Joseph's Bengal Tiger at the Baghdad Zoo, which moved to Broadway in 2011. The same year she portrayed the First Lady turned president, Dalia Hassan, in the FOX series “24”.

Zadegan appeared in the 2010 film Elena Undone in the title role of Elena Winters for FilmMcQueen. That same year she also appeared opposite Michael Sheen and Samuel L. Jackson in the role of Jehan Younger in the Columbia Tri Star psychological thriller Unthinkable.

Zadegan returned to television as resident villainess Isabel on the NBC series The Event. She then took on the series regular role of Dr. Gina Bandari on the 2012 series Emily Owens M.D. She appeared as Scarlet Leon, the female lead, opposite Greg Kinnear in the 2014 American version of the comedy Rake.

Later that same year she rounded out the all female-lead cast for Bravo's first scripted series Girlfriends' Guide to Divorce in the role of Delia Banai. The show went on to be the first ever to get a three-season pickup and ran for five seasons before premiering its final season in Spring 2018.

In 2015 Zadegan continued to appear in other television roles such as Extant, Legends and as the Queen of Iran opposite Michael Sheen for Showtime's critical success Masters of Sex.

Zadegan joined the cast of NCIS: New Orleans in October 2018 playing the role of Special Agent Hannah Khoury, the senior agent in the NCIS New Orleans office.

Zadegan played the role of Ra-Sharir in the first two episodes of season 3 of Documentary Now! for IFC.

Filmography

Video games

References

External links
 
 

1982 births
21st-century American actresses
Actresses from California
Actresses from San Francisco
Female models from California
American film actresses
American people of Iranian descent
American stage actresses
American television actresses
German emigrants to the United States
Living people
University of California, Santa Barbara alumni
German people of Iranian descent